Dragan Čavić (born 10 March 1958) is a Bosnian Serb politician who was the 5th President of Republika Srpska from 28 November 2002 until 9 November 2006, after having been Vice President from 2000 to 2002.

From 20 July 2004 until 15 December 2006, he was the President of the Serb Democratic Party.

Education and personal life
Čavić attended elementary and high school in Banja Luka, and graduated from the Economics Faculty of the University of Banja Luka in 1980. He worked as an economist, financial manager and commercial director in several public and private companies. Čavić is married and has a son and a daughter.

Political career
Čavić is a former member of the Serb Democratic Party: he served as president of the party until 2006, after having been deputy president of the party presidency from June 1998 to March 2002. At the party elections in 2002 he was elected deputy president of the party.

In 1998, he was elected deputy in the National Assembly of Republika Srpska. He was removed from office by the then High Representative Carlos Westendorp since he was deemed obstructing implementation of the Dayton Peace Agreement, and banned from political activity. The decision was overturned in 1999 by Vestendorp's successor, Wolfgang Petritsch.

Čavić became the president of Republika Srpska on 28 November 2002, after the municipal elections in Bosnia and Herzegovina in October, thus replacing the former president Mirko Šarović. He received 35.9% of votes, while his most successful rival, Milan Jelić, won 22.1%. Voter turnout was 53.9%.

At the 2006 Bosnian general election, Čavić lost in the race for president of Republika Srpska to his rival Milan Jelić (SNSD). Shortly afterwards he was blamed for the defeat and resigned as president of the SDS. The SDS was then split between two factions in conflicts: the reformists led by Čavić, and the conservatives backed by Dragan Kalinić, former President of the SDS.

On 11 December 2008, he announced at a press conference his retirement from the SDS and the launch of a new party, together with the RS MP Vojislav Gligić and Branislav Škobo, also former SDS MPs. On 15 January 2009 in Banja Luka Čavić registered the Democratic Party of Republika Srpska, whose co-founders are Momčilo Novaković, Gligić, Škobo and Đorđe Milićević. Since 2010, he has been a deputy of this party in the National Assembly of Republika Srpska.

At the 2012 municipal elections, Čavić run for mayor of Banja Luka; with 32.2% of the vote, he came second to Slobodan Gavranović (SNSD), elected with 40.2% of the votes.

In 2013, his Democratic Party merged with the National Democratic Party to form the National Democratic Movement.

Honors
Order of the Republika Srpska (2012)

References

External links

Internet stranica Demokratske partije RS
Blog Dragana Čavića

1958 births
Living people
Politicians from Zenica
Serbs of Bosnia and Herzegovina
Serb Democratic Party (Bosnia and Herzegovina) politicians
Vice presidents of Republika Srpska